Ida Rosenthal (née Kaganovich; January 9, 1886 – March 29, 1973) was a Belarusian-born American dressmaker and businesswoman who co-founded Maidenform.

Biography
She was born to a Jewish family in Rakaŭ, near Minsk, then part of the Russian Empire. her father was a Hebrew scholar and her mother ran a small general store. 

  At the age of 18, she emigrated to the United States, following her fiancé William Rosenthal, and Americanized her (maiden) name to Cohen. Those who knew her well called her Itel. In 1907 she got married and partnershiped with her husband.  

In 1921, along with Enid Bisset, she opened up a dress shop, which a year later was registered the name Maiden Form.  In 1925 the first Maidenform plant was opened in Bayonne, New Jersey to focus solely on their most popular product, brassieres (although the company later produced lingerie and swimwear as well). Despite the Great Depression and Enid's retirement, the partnership was very successful and expanded into markets across the United States, Europe and Latin America.

The Maidenform bra originated as an accessory to improve the fit of the dresses they sold, but it became so popular that they began to sell it separately.  Their product was a major improvement over previous bras, because they used cups that supported and conformed to the breasts, rather than flattening them as had been the Flapper style (known as the "Boyish Form").

Under Ida and her husband's leadership, Maidenform made many other advancements. Maidenform was the first company to sell maternity bras, and William invented a standard for cup sizes. In 1942, Ida received a patent for an adjustable fastener. During this time, Maidenform was also known for its racy newspaper ads featuring underwear models and its advertising slogan "I dreamed... in a Maidenform Bra."

After William's death in 1958, Ida became the company president. Ida died in 1973 of pneumonia, leaving the company in control of her son-in-law Dr. Joseph Coleman. Upon Coleman's death in 1968, Ida's daughter Beatrice Rosenthal Coleman gained control over the company.

References

External links 
Brody, Seymour.  Jewish Heroes & Heroines of America: 150 True Stories of American Jewish Heroism.  Hollywood, FL: Lifetime Books, Inc., 1996. 
Lin, Patricia.  Ida Kaganovich Rosenthal
PBS Online: They Made America. Ida Rosenthal: Brassiere Tycoon.  PBS Online/WGBH, 2004.
Snyder, Jennifer and Minnick, Mimi.  Maidenform Collection, 1922-1997.  Smithsonian Institution Archives Center.

1886 births
1973 deaths
American manufacturing businesspeople
American fashion businesspeople
Belarusian Jews
Jews from the Russian Empire
Emigrants from the Russian Empire to the United States
People from Valozhyn District
Jewish women